Law enforcement in Lithuania is the responsibility of a "unified national police force under the jurisdiction of the Interior Ministry."  From the Lithuanian Police Department by the Ministry of the Interior, which is led by the Police Commissar General, the police force branches out to the National and Municipal Police.

The National Police is composed of the:

 Criminal Police Bureau 
 Traffic Police
 Public Security Force
 Public Police

Organization

Criminal police

The Criminal Police Bureau is designed to create a secure environment and serving to the public while implementing the prevention of serious criminal acts, while disclosing and investigating them, while coordinating the investigations and while promoting international cooperation.

Lithuanian Criminal Police Bureau consists of the following divisions:
Organized Crime Investigation Units;
Crime Investigation Units;
Operational Activity Units;
Witness and Victims Protection Units;
Corruption Control Board;
International Liaison Office;
Information Analysis Board;
Activity Organization and Finance Units.

International cooperation 
The Lithuanian police force is a member of:
Interpol
Europol

References